The 2010 Georgia Southern Eagles team represented Georgia Southern University in the 2010 NCAA Division I FCS football season. The Eagles were led by first-year head coach Jeff Monken and played their home games at Paulson Stadium. They are a member of the Southern Conference. They finished the season 10–5, 5–3 in Southern Conference play.

Schedule

References

Georgia Southern
Georgia Southern Eagles football seasons
Georgia Southern
Georgia Southern Eagles football